Less Than Kind is a comedy-drama produced by Mark McKinney that previously aired on Citytv and currently is shown on HBO Canada. The show is set in Winnipeg, and stars Jesse Camacho as Sheldon Blecher, an overweight teenager struggling with a highly dysfunctional, but lovable, family. Other members of the Blecher family include Sheldon's father Sam, a failing driving instructor, played by Maury Chaykin, mother Anne, a closeted pyromaniac, played by Wendel Meldrum, and brother Josh, an actor with delusions of grandeur, played by Benjamin Arthur.

The theme song for the show is "One Great City!" by Canadian indie rock band The Weakerthans.

Series overview

Episodes

Season 1 (2008–09)

Season 2 (2010)

Season 3 (2012)

Season 4 (2013)

References

External links
 

Less Than Kind